The ECS Bridge over Big Goose Creek was a bridge near Sheridan, Wyoming, that was built in 1914. It was a Pratt pony truss bridge built by the Canton Bridge Company of Canton, Ohio. The Canton Bridge Company built four steel bridges in Wyoming in 1914; when nominated to the National Register of Historic Places in 1982, the ECS Bridge was the only one of these surviving in its original location.

It was one of 171 Wyoming bridges surveyed in a study that led to the nomination of 31 of them for NRHP listing. The ECS bridge was listed on the National Register of Historic Places (NRHP) in 1985.

Two other Canton Bridge Company bridges in Wyoming are also listed on the NRHP:
EDL Peloux Bridge, County Road CN16-40, in or near Buffalo, Wyoming and
EDZ Irigary Bridge, County Road CN16-254, in or near Sussex, Wyoming.

See also
List of bridges documented by the Historic American Engineering Record in Wyoming

References

External links

 and 

Road bridges on the National Register of Historic Places in Wyoming
Bridges completed in 1914
Buildings and structures in Sheridan County, Wyoming
Transportation in Sheridan County, Wyoming
Historic American Engineering Record in Wyoming
National Register of Historic Places in Sheridan County, Wyoming
Steel bridges in the United States
Pratt truss bridges in the United States